Kayu Agung is a town and the capital of Ogan Komering Ilir Regency in South Sumatra province of Indonesia. Its population was 62,694 at the 2010 Census and 75,976 at the 2020 Census.

Climate
Kayu Agung has a tropical rainforest climate (Af) with moderate rainfall from June to September and heavy to very heavy rainfall from October to May.

References

Regency seats of South Sumatra